Alaa Binrajab (born 22 September 2004) is a Bahraini swimmer.

In 2018, she competed in the women's 50 metre freestyle and women's 100 metre freestyle events at the 2018 FINA World Swimming Championships (25 m) held in Hangzhou, China.  

In 2019, she represented Bahrain at the 2019 World Aquatics Championships held in Gwangju, South Korea. She competed in the women's 50 metre freestyle and women's 100 metre freestyle events. In the 100 metre freestyle she was placed 1st in her heat.

References 

Living people
2004 births
Place of birth missing (living people)
Bahraini female swimmers
Bahraini female freestyle swimmers